Bletsoe Castle was a late medieval fortified manor house in the village of Bletsoe, Bedfordshire.

Details
Bletsoe Castle was created by John Pateshull, who received a licence to crenellate an existing manor house on the east side of Bletsoe in 1327. Pateshull had owned the manor of Bletsoe since 1313, but with the death of his mother, in 1324, he inherited additional lands, allowing him to acquire permission to crenellate the property.

In 1421 the house descended to Margaret Beauchamp who married Sir Oliver St John. On his death in 1437 she remarried John Beaufort, 1st Duke of Somerset and had one daughter, Margaret Beaufort, Countess of Richmond and Derby, who was born in the house on 31 May, although it remains in dispute whether she was born in 1441 or 1443. Margaret Beaufort later became the mother of Henry VII of England.

The house later passed down in the St John of Bletsoe family. In the late 16th or early 17th century, a new building was erected around the castle, quadrangular in design with three or four storeys and gable windows. Much of this later building was pulled down, leaving a much smaller building, still incorporating parts of the older castle, within the older medieval earthworks.

Today the castle is a scheduled monument and a Grade II* listed building. The moat is water-filled in parts though the south side has been destroyed by the construction of agricultural buildings over it.

See also
Castles in Great Britain and Ireland
List of castles in England

References

Bibliography
MacKenzie, James Dixon. (1896/2009) The Castles of England: Their Story and Structure. General Books LLC. .
Rickard, John. (2002) The castle community: the personnel of English and Welsh castles, 1272-1422. Woodbridge, UK: Boydell Press. .

External links 
 Investigation History

Castles in Bedfordshire
Scheduled monuments in Bedfordshire
Grade II* listed buildings in Bedfordshire